Mamoon Hamid (born 1978) is a Pakistani-American venture capitalist currently serving as a Managing Member and General Partner at the venture capital firm Kleiner Perkins.

Career

Xilinx and USVP 
Early in his career he held various business and engineering roles at Xilinx, and he subsequently joined U.S. Venture Partners (USVP) in 2005, where he led early-stage investments in startups such as Yammer and Box.

Social Capital 
In 2011, he co-founded the investment firm Social Capital where has led investments in companies such as Intercom, Greenhouse, Netskope, and Front, and he was the first outside investor in the unicorn startup Slack.

Kleiner Perkins 
He became a Managing Member and General Partner at Kleiner Perkins in August 2017.

Forbes has included him on its Midas List of top tech investors in five consecutive years. He appeared on the Midas List for the first time in 2014 and remains one of its youngest members. In 2017, he ranked No. 76 among the Top 100 VCs by Electronics Weekly and No. 61 among the Top 100 Venture Capitalists named by The New York Times and CB Insights.

Public involvement 
As chairman of the Institute for Constitutional Advocacy and Protection, Hamid organized a private fundraiser for the institute the day after Executive Order 13769 was signed on January 20, 2017. The event raised $1 million from contributors to "challenge the Trump administration’s most controversial policies in court."

Personal life 
Hamid lives with his wife Dr Aaliya Yaqub and children in Palo Alto, California.

See also 
 Social Capital (venture capital)
 Legal challenges to the Trump travel ban

References

External links 
 Profile at KPCB

Living people
1978 births
American people of Pakistani descent
American venture capitalists
Harvard Business School alumni
Kleiner Perkins people
Pakistani emigrants to the United States
Pakistani venture capitalists
Purdue University alumni
Stanford University alumni